EVS may refer to:
Ecks vs. Sever, a 2001 video game
 Electric Vehicle Symposium
 Employee voice, survey
 Enhanced vision system
 Enhanced Voice Services
 European Voluntary Service
 EVS Broadcast Equipment, a Belgian company
 Exposure Value Scale, a photography technique
 Ethan Van Sciver, a comic artist.

Blood bike (Emergency Voluntary Service) groups
 Bloodrun EVS, operating primarily in Cleveland and North Yorkshire
 Freewheelers EVS, operating primarily in Bath, Bristol, Gloucestershire (south), Somerset and West Wiltshire